Héctor Acosta may refer to:

 Héctor Acosta (cyclist) (born 1933), Argentine Olympic cyclist
 Héctor Acosta (footballer, born 1991), Mexican footballer
 Héctor Acosta (footballer, born 2000), Venezuelan footballer
 Héctor Acosta (singer) (born 1967), Dominican musician